Edward Moran (1829–1901) was an American artist.

Edward Moran may also refer to:

Edward C. Moran Jr. (1894–1967), American politician from Maine
Edward Percy Moran (1862–1935), American artist, son of Edward Moran
Edward S. Moran Jr. (1900–1996), New York politician

See also 

Ed Moran (born 1981), long-distance track and roadrunner

Edward J. Moran, a 2006 tugboat in the port of East Boothbay, Maine

Moran, Edward